The Upper Angara Range is a mountain range in Buryatia and Irkutsk Oblast, Russia, part of the Stanovoy Highlands.

The Baikal–Amur Mainline passes at the foot of the southern side of the range.

Geography
It forms the northern limit of the Upper Angara Depression, rising above the right bank of the Upper Angara River which flows into Lake Baikal. To the east rises the Delyun-Uran, the northernmost range of the Stanovoy Highlands. The main ridge is relatively narrow, with sharp peaks, cirques and glacial troughs.

Hydrography
The range forms a watershed that separates the Mama River basin to the north from the right tributaries of the Upper Angara to the south. The Kichera, one of the rivers flowing into Baikal, originates at the southwestern end of the ridge.
Rivers Left Mama and Right Mama, which form the Mama River, a tributary of the Vitim, as well as the Chaya, have their sources in the northern side of the range.

Flora
The slopes of the range are mainly covered with larch taiga, with mountain tundra and bare summits (golets) at higher elevations.

See also
List of mountains and hills of Russia
List of ultras of Northeast Asia

References

External links
Лето 2020 часть 1. Верхнеангарский хребет
Верхне Ангарский хребет 2008

Mountain ranges of Russia
Mountains of Buryatia
Mountains of Irkutsk Oblast
South Siberian Mountains

ru:Верхнеангарский хребет